Grottendorf is the name of following places:

 a cadastral community of the municipal Feistritz am Wechsel in Lower Austria, Austria
 a cadastral community of the municipal Gföhl in Lower Austria, Austria

References